Dolichognatha kratochvili is a species of spider in the family Tetragnathidae, found in the Congo.

References

Tetragnathidae
Spiders of Africa
Spiders described in 1938